Spaced Out (known in French as Allô la Terre, ici les Martin) is an animated series, co-produced by Alphanim Productions, Tooncan Productions and Cartoon Network Europe, in association with several other companies and television networks. The series had one season with 26 episodes. It aired on Toon Disney in the United States from October 4, 2002.

Synopsis
George Martin lives in a regular neighbourhood with his family and applies for a job in the apparently monopolistic company, Krach Industries. Although they do not intend to hire him, his application is accidentally blown by the wind to the heap of selected candidates. This leads to George being hired as director of a secret orbital station (Operation SOS) housing sub-development, where he and his family have to live as an experiment started by Krach. When the Martins arrive at the station, they meet other people who have also been sent by Krach to live there. To their surprise, their neighbour and teacher who taught the Martins' kids on Earth is also on the station with her son. Later, they save a Russian cosmonaut who decides to live with them. And so, they continue living on the space station, occasionally having personal disputes, meeting aliens and being monopolised by Krach.

Voice cast
 Mark Camacho as George Martin, director of the space station. He is in charge of running the station and changing it from night to day. He denies the existence of extraterrestrial life, and even when there's proof in front of him, he's always skeptical and holds by his theory. Even when they took over the station on his birthday, he only believes Monica hired a bunch of actors to give him a sort of role-playing adventure as a present.
 Ellen David as Monica Martin, George's wife who loves order in her house. She also believes in aliens.
 Eleanor Noble as Betty Martin, George's teenage daughter and a manic depressive. She likes music and seems to only enjoy catching up with friends which she has been completely deprived of upon arriving in the station. She's hinted to be very intelligent and sometimes shows rare compassion to her family.
 Daniel Brochu as Benjamin Martin, George's plump son and a cosmic super-hero fanatic. He is also fond of computers and technology. He shows a more rebellious side of him when he got sent to prison on the station once for stealing a comic his parents promised to buy him for his birthday, even if he did regret it.
 Sonja Ball as Gran, George's mother and the Martin kids' grandmother. She is a fitness fanatic and Monica and her have an antagonistic relationship.
 Rick Jones as Fax and Goodgrief, the Martin kids' dog and cat, they almost always end up talking about the events that happened during the episode at the end of it, it is also hinted they may be aliens themselves; and Guy, Dumped by Krach to live on the station. He does all the work except those done by George. It is hinted most of the time that he's either a clone or a brainwashed individual sent to the station by Krach as a prototype for the "perfect multi-functional worker".
 Susan Glover as Mrs. Schuman, the Martin children's neighbour and teacher back on Earth and on the station.
 Ricky Mabe as Bobby Schuman, Mrs. Schuman's son. Although he keeps a friendly facade in front of the adults, he shows a very sadistic and manipulative side when he's with the other kids and sometimes his mother. As shown when he discreetly bullies Benjamin on earth. Relations with him and Benjamin have greatly improved since he was almost abducted on the station.
 Bruce Dinsmore as Boris Malakoff, a Russian/Soviet cosmonaut who decides to live on the station after crashing there. He becomes the new pilot of the Earth station shuttle. Boris is the only member of the principal cast who does not appear in all episodes, being introduced in episode 2.

Episodes
Note: This list includes the original airdates of the Pan-European Cartoon Network. Spaced Out premiered on January 7, 2002, on Cartoon Network (UK & Ireland) and on July 2, 2002, on Canal+ in France.

References

External links

BCDB page on the show
Official page at Gaumont Animation

2001 French television series debuts
2005 French television series endings
2001 Canadian television series debuts
2005 Canadian television series endings
2000s French animated television series
French children's animated space adventure television series
French children's animated comic science fiction television series
Canadian children's animated space adventure television series
Canadian children's animated comic science fiction television series
Cartoon Network original programming
English-language television shows
2000s Canadian animated television series
2000s Canadian comic science fiction television series
Canal+ original programming